Colin Donnell (born October 9, 1982) is an American actor and singer best known for his performances as Billy Crocker in Anything Goes, Tommy Merlyn in The CW television series Arrow, Scotty Lockhart on the Showtime drama The Affair and as Dr. Connor Rhodes in the NBC medical drama Chicago Med (2015–2019). He also starred in the 2022 Netflix/Peacock miniseries Irreverent.

Early life and education 
Colin Donnell was born in St. Louis, Missouri, as the youngest of three boys. He has Irish and French ancestry. He played the guitar and took singing lessons when he was 17. His introduction to the stage was in high school where he was a part of the choir and was in the background juggling and doing circus tricks, which led to being part of his first school musical production of Barnum. Donnell graduated from Indiana University in 2005.

Career 
Donnell has been part of many national stage tours, such as Mamma Mia! and Wicked. His first Broadway Theatre performance was in Jersey Boys as Hank Mejewski. His other stage credits include Follies, Meet Me in St. Louis, Johnny Baseball and many more. He played Billy Crocker in the 2011 Broadway revival of Anything Goes and was nominated for a Drama Desk Award for Outstanding Actor in a Musical, an Outer Critics Circle Award for Outstanding Featured Actor in a Musical, and an Astaire Award for Outstanding Male Dancer.

Donnell made his television debut by playing Mike Ruskin in the television series Pan Am. In 2012, Donnell was cast as Tommy Merlyn in television series Arrow, where he is a series regular in the first season and made occasional appearances in later seasons, including the final season.

In July and August 2013, Donnell starred as Berowne in the musical adaptation of Shakespeare's Love's Labour's Lost. He also appeared as Elizabeth Banks' husband in the crime thriller Every Secret Thing, which was released on May 15, 2015.

In January 2014, Donnell was cast as Monty in the 1960s-era Broadway musical Violet alongside Sutton Foster and Joshua Henry; previews began on March 28, and the show officially opened on April 20. In July, Donnell was cast to play Joshua Jackson's brother in Showtime original drama The Affair.

In 2015, he performed in the City Center Encores! production of the musical Lady, Be Good, alongside Tommy Tune, Erin Mackey and Patti Murin.

In March 2015, Donnell starred in Love Is A Four Letter Word, a pilot for NBC in which he played Sean, an ad agency partner; the show was not picked up to series. Donnell then landed a regular role in the NBC series, Chicago Med, playing a doctor in trauma surgery. On April 19, 2019, it was announced that Donnell was leaving the series after four seasons as a series regular.

Personal life 
Donnell began dating actress Patti Murin in 2013 after they co-starred in a Shakespeare in the Park musical adaptation of Love's Labour's Lost. They became engaged in December 2014, and married on June 19, 2015, in New York City. Their daughter, Cecily, was born on July 14, 2020. In October 2022, the couple announced that Murin is pregnant with their second child.

Donnell is a literary aficionado and a musician. He has two tattoos from his tour trips – one from Memphis and one from Dayton; which are five silhouettes of birds to represent his family, and a Fleur De Lis, because his mother is French.

Filmography

Theater

References

External links 

 
 
 

1982 births
21st-century American male actors
American male film actors
American male musical theatre actors
American male stage actors
American male television actors
American people of French descent
American people of Irish descent
Indiana University alumni
Living people
Male actors from St. Louis